Mark Greenan (born 30 June 1966) is a Canadian former professional tennis player.

A left-handed player from Cambridge, Ontario, Greenan was a four-time national champion in doubles and played doubles on the Canada Davis Cup team from 1985 to 1987.

Greenan was All-American at Wake Forest University, where he played from 1984 to 1988. He made the NCAA doubles semi-finals in 1988 (with Christian Dallwitz) and was twice named All-ACC.

See also
List of Canada Davis Cup team representatives

References

External links
 
 
 

1966 births
Living people
Canadian male tennis players
Wake Forest Demon Deacons men's tennis players
Racket sportspeople from Ontario
Sportspeople from Cambridge, Ontario